Mary Mount may refer to:

Mary Cameron (mother of David Cameron), née Mary Mount
Mary's Mount, historic home in Maryland, USA

See also
 Marymount (disambiguation)